Brandon Hepburn (born December 6, 1989) is a former American football linebacker. He played college football for Florida A&M and was drafted in the seventh round of the 2013 NFL Draft by the Detroit Lions.

Early years
Hepburn attended North Rockland High School in Thiells, New York. His senior season saw him amass 132 tackles, 8 sacks and an interception in addition to him being awarded the Journal News Scholar Athlete award.

College career
He played college football at Florida A&M. Hepburn redshirted in 2008. The following year, he was relegated to special teams duty and had 13 total tackles. In 2010, he played in all 11 games recording 63 tackles, a sack and a forced fumble. In his senior year, he found himself with 86 tackles, 5.5 sacks, 7 passes deflected and a forced fumble and was named 1st team all-MEAC.

Professional career

Detroit Lions
Hepburn was selected by the Detroit Lions in the seventh round (245th overall) of the 2013 NFL Draft. The Lions later signed Hepburn to a reserve/future contract on January 3, 2014.

Philadelphia Eagles
Hepburn was signed to the Philadelphia Eagles practice squad on September 9, 2014. On September 30, 2014, he was released. On October 7, 2014, he was re-signed to practice squad. On January 5, 2015, he signed a future contract. On August 14, 2015, he was waived. On August 17, 2015, he was placed on injured reserve. On August 21, 2015, he was waived from injured reserve. On November 30, 2015, he was placed on injured reserve.

Dallas Cowboys
Hepburn signed to the Dallas Cowboys on June 8, 2016. On September 3, 2016, he was released by the Cowboys.

References

External links
 NFL Draft Profile

1989 births
Living people
American football linebackers
Dallas Cowboys players
Detroit Lions players
Florida A&M Rattlers football players
People from Nyack, New York
People from Thiells, New York
Philadelphia Eagles players
Players of American football from New York (state)
Sportspeople from the New York metropolitan area